Cohors [prima] "Augusta Nervia Pacensis" / "Aurelia" / "Flavia Malvensis" Brittonum milliaria [peditata] ("[1st infantry 1000 strong] "venerable, Nervian and peaceful" / "Aurelian" / "Flavian" cohort of Brittones") was a Roman auxiliary infantry cohort. The cohort stationed in Dacia at castra Buridava, castra of Bumbești-Jiu (Gară) and Vârtop) and castra Malva.

See also 
 List of Roman auxiliary regiments

References
 Academia Română: Istoria Românilor, Vol. 2, Daco-romani, romanici, alogeni, 2nd. Ed., București, 2010, 
 Constantin C. Petolescu: Dacia - Un mileniu de istorie, Ed. Academiei Române, 2010, 
 Cristian M. Vlădescu: Fortificațiile romane din Dacia Inferior, Craiova, 1986
 Petru Ureche: Tactică, strategie și specific de luptă la cohortele equitate din Dacia Romană

Military of ancient Rome
Auxiliary peditata units of ancient Rome
Roman Dacia